Fish Lake is the name of many lakes:

Canada

Alberta
Fish Lake, four different lakes in Alberta
Fish Lakes, a group of lakes in Alberta

British Columbia
 Fish Lake, two different lakes in the Cassiar Land District 
 Fish Lake, two different lakes in the Kootenay Land District
 Fish Lake, in the Similkameen Division of the Yale Land District
 Fish Lake, two different lakes in the Coast Land District
 Fish Lake, in Range 4 Coast Land District
 Fish Lake, in Range 5 Coast Land District
 Fish Lake, in the Cariboo Land District (Chilcotin region)
 Fish Lake, three different lakes in the Lillooet the Land District
 Fish Lake Indian Reserve 5, an Indian Reserve in the Lillooet Land District
 Fish Lake Indian Reserve 7, an Indian Reserve in the Lillooet Land District
 Fish Lake, a former post office in the Lillooet Land District (now Brexton, British Columbia
the name has also been used historically for many other lakes, including:
 Darke Lake (Darke Lake Provincial Park) in the Okanagan region (Osoyoos Division, Yale Land District)

Manitoba
Fish Lake, three different lakes in Manitoba

New Brunswick
Fish Lake, a lake in Queens County
Fish Lake, two different lakes in Victoria County
Fish Lake, a lake in Northumberland County
Fish Lake, two different lakes in York County
Fish Lakes, a group of lakes in York County

Northwest Territories
Fish Lake, four different lakes in the Mackenzie District of the Northwest Territories
Fish Lake, in the Franklin District of the Northwest Territories

Nova Scotia
Fish Lake, three different lakes in Halifax County
Fish Lake, a lake in Pictou County
Fish Lake, a lake in Guysborough County

Nunavut
Fish Lake, a lake in Nunavut

Ontario
Fish Lake, two different lakes in the Nipissing region
Fish Lake Mountain, a mountain in the Nipissing region
Fish Lake, a lake in the Kenora region
Fish Lake, a lake in the Parry Sound/Muskoka region
Fish Lake, two different lakes in the Sudbury region
Fish Lake, a lake in Frontenac County
Fish Lake, a lake in Algoma County
Fish Lake, a lake in Prince Edward County

Saskatchewan
Fish Lake, five different lakes in Saskatchewan

Yukon
Fish Lake, two different lakes in the Yukon Territory

New Zealand
 Fish Lake, in the Nelson District on the South Island

United States

Arkansas
 Fish Lake, in Arkansas County, Arkansas
 Fish Lake, in Conway County, Arkansas
 Fish Lake, in Hempstead County, Arkansas
 Fish Lake, in Independence County, Arkansas
 Fish Lake, in Lincoln County, Arkansas
 Fish Lake, in Little River County, Arkansas
 Fish Lake, in Miller County, Arkansas
 Fish Lake, in Monroe County, Arkansas
 Fish Lake, in Woodruff County, Arkansas

Colorado
 Fish Lake, east of Pagosa Springs
 Fish Lake, in Delta County

Illinois
 Fish Lake, in Lake County, previously known as Duncan Lake.

Indiana
 Fish Lake, in LaGrange County, Indiana
 Fish Lake, in LaPorte County, Indiana

Kentucky
(from Kentucky Gazetteer) 
Fish Lake, in Ballard County, Kentucky
Fish Lake, in Carlisle County, Kentucky

Michigan
Fish Lake, in Lapeer County, Michigan

Minnesota
Fish Lake, in Jackson County, Minnesota
Fish Lake, in Le Sueur County, Minnesota
Fish Lake, in Cedar Township, Martin County, Minnesota
Fish Lake, in Lake Belt Township, Martin County, Minnesota
Fish Lake, in Scott County, Minnesota
Fish Lake, in Kanabec County, Minnesota
Fish Lake, in Eagan, Minnesota of Dakota County, Minnesota
Fish Lake, in Maple Grove, Hennepin County, Minnesota
Fish Lake, in Fredenberg Township, St. Louis County, Minnesota

Montana
 Fish Lake in Lincoln County, Montana
 Fish Lake in Park County, Montana
 Fish Lake in Pondera County, Montana
 Fish Lake in Pondera County, Montana
 Fish Lake in Ravalli County, Montana
 Fish Lake in Sweet Grass County, Montana

Nevada
 Fish Lake, in Esmeralda County, Nevada

North Dakota
 Fish Lake, in Benson County, North Dakota
 Fish Lake, in Burke County, North Dakota

Oregon
(from Geographic Names Information System. USGS.) 
Fish Lake, in Baker County, Oregon
Fish Lake, in Douglas County, Oregon
Fish Lake, in Harney County, Oregon
Fish Lake (Jackson County, Oregon)
Fish Lake, in Josephine County, Oregon
Fish Lake, three different lakes in Lake County, Oregon 
Fish Lake, in Linn County, Oregon
Fish Lake (Marion County, Oregon)

South Dakota
 Fish Lake, in Aurora County, South Dakota
 Fish Lake, in Deuel County, South Dakota

Texas
 Fish Lake, in Fort Bend County, Texas
 Fish Lake, in Hardin County, Texas
 Fish Lake, in Panola County, Texas
 Fish Lake, in Rains County, Texas

Utah
Fish Lake, in Sevier County, Utah
 Fish Lake, two separate lakes in Summit County, Utah
 Fish Lake, in Uintah County, Utah

Washington
(from Washington Place Names search) 
 Fish Lake, in Chelan County, Washington
 Fish Lake, in Ferry County, Washington
 Fish Lake, in Grant County, Washington
 Fish Lake, in King County, Washington
 Fish Lake, in Kittitas County, Washington
 Fish Lake, in Okanogan County, Washington
 Fish Lake, in Spokane County, Washington
 Fish Lake, in Yakima County, Washington

See also

 List of lakes
 Lists of lakes

References

External links
 "Fish Lake" at Getty Thesaurus of Geographic Names